"The Thanksgiving Special" is the collective name for the thirteenth and fourteenth episodes of the fifth season of the American animated television series Regular Show, as well as the 133rd and 134th episodes of the series overall. A Thanksgiving special, the episode aired on Cartoon Network on November 25, 2013.

The episode drew in 3.04 million viewers, making it the most viewed episode of the fifth season.

Plot
Mordecai and Rigby accidentally wreck the park's Thanksgiving dinner by playing football in the house. The other park workers decide to replace the meal before their families arrive, refusing to let Mordecai and Rigby help. The duo then sees a commercial on TV advertising a contest to write a Thanksgiving song with the chance of winning a “turducken” (a chicken stuffed into a duck stuffed into a turkey). They decide to enter the contest, but quickly find that writing the song isn't as easy as they thought.

Meanwhile, Benson, Pops, and Skips go to the store for another turkey and subsequently get in a battle with three men dressed as a pilgrim, an Indian, and a turkey over the last one in stock, which is eventually run over on the street. Muscle Man and High-Five Ghost go out for more sides and get in an end zone dance competition with Broc Stettman, a football player. Thomas goes to the airport to pick up the park workers' families. Mordecai and Rigby get caught in traffic and ride from Margaret's father Frank in his weather helicopter. They arrive just in time to enter, still very unprepared. The previous entry, in which a billionaire, Richard Buckner, paid a group of professional singers to write and perform, is the clear favorite.

As Mordecai and Rigby are about to start, Thomas informs them that their families’ flights have been delayed to the following day. They decide to sing about how family and friends are more important than food, with Buckner's back-up musicians joining in, and win the contest. However, Buckner, furious over his loss, steals the turducken. The rest of the park workers, who saw the song on TV, decide to work with their rivals to get it back. They catch Buckner's blimp, and he explains that he wants the turducken as it has a golden wishbone that actually grants wishes, and he wants to use it to gain the rights to Thanksgiving and have all his employees thank him, much to Mordecai and Rigby's shock. Mordecai and Rigby fight Buckner with help from their friends; however, they fall out of the blimp, but not before swiping the wishbone and replacing it with Rigby's spoons. Buckner makes his wish, only to realize that Mordecai and Rigby have deceived him, moments before the blimp crashes and kills him. While falling, Mordecai and Rigby wish to be safe at home with their families and break the bone just in time. After appearing back at the house, Thomas informs them he was mistaken about the flights being delayed (having mistakenly checked the departure schedule instead of the arrivals, to everyone's anger), and their families, along with Broc and his team, Farmer Jimmy, some of Buckner's singers, and the three costumed men, are already there and have replaced the dinner. Benson gives Mordecai and Rigby a toast thanking them for saving Thanksgiving, and the episode ends with everyone eating the meal.

Production
The episode was written and storyboarded by Benton Connor, Toby Jones, Andres Salaff, and Calvin Wong, and was directed by series creator J. G. Quintel and supervising producer Mike Roth. The episode includes guest stars Terry Crews, Chord Overstreet, LaToya Luckett and Josh Keaton. The episode also includes two original songs, What Are You Thankful For?  and Chewing on Freedom.

According to J. G. Quintel, the episode "[had] some really awesome songs", but the crew "ended up having to record the people in the songs all at separate times", which proved challenging.

The episode was watched by 3.04 million viewers.

Reception
Alasdair Wilkins of the AV Club wrote that the special was "A worthy companion to last year’s brilliant Christmas special", complementing the special for "all the things associated with thanksgiving: food, football, good cheer, and most importantly family". Wilkins also complemented the family and friendship bonds throughout the show that the special has shown. Austin Allison from Collider placed the special as one of the "Top 10 Cartoon Thanksgiving Animated Specials to Gobble Down This Season", praising the special for managing to "ring in the true meaning of the holiday of being thankful for the ones closest to you, through song-form and hamboning."

Paul Le also placed the special as one of the "14 Best Thanksgiving Episodes in Animated Television, Ranked", stating that "Regular Show is always weird, but this Thanksgiving special takes the cake. Or should we say, "turkey?""

Cultural References
Stettman's football jersey resembles the jersey used by the NFL team, the Pittsburgh Steelers, in the 1970s. The water tower in the episode also has the current logo of Cartoon Network. The episode's main antagonist, Richard Buckner, is a parody of businessman, television host, and future (now former) United States President Donald Trump and Walmart and Sam's Club Founder Sam Walton.

References

External links 
 

Regular Show episodes
2013 American television episodes
Thanksgiving television specials
Parodies of Donald Trump